Xinfu may refer to the following locations in China:

Xinfu District, Fushun, Liaoning
Xinfu District, Xinzhou, Shanxi
Xinfu, Heng County, town in and subdivision of Heng County, Guangxi

Subdistricts 
Xinfu Subdistrict, Shantou, subdivision of Jinping District, Shantou, Guangdong
Xinfu Subdistrict, Qitaihe, subdivision of Qiezihe District, Qitaihe, Heilongjiang
Xinfu Subdistrict, Fushun, subdivision of Xinfu District, Fushun, Liaoning

Townships 
Xinfu Township, Suibin County, subdivision of Suibin County, Heilongjiang
Xinfu Township, Zhaozhou County, subdivision of Zhaozhou County, Heilongjiang

See also
Xingfu (disambiguation)